Coca-Cola Clear is a colorless variant of the soft drink Coca-Cola. Without the normal caramel ingredient, Coca-Cola Clear has none of the typical dark Coke color. The drink is lemon-flavored to compensate for the removed caramel. It was developed at Coca-Cola Asia Pacific and launched locally in Japan in June 2018. A lime-flavored variation was released on June 10, 2019, known as Coca-Cola Clear Lime. Unlike regular Coca-Cola Clear, which is sweetened with both sucralose and acesulfame potassium, Coca-Cola Clear Lime is instead sweetened with high-fructose corn syrup.

Production and distribution
Coca-Cola Clear is officially available in Japan but is also available in Taiwan and China through specialty import outlets.

See also 
 Crystal Pepsi
 White Coke

References

Coca-Cola brands
Food and drink introduced in 2018
Lemon sodas